Varakhsha, also Varasha or Varahsha, was an ancient city in the Bukhara oasis in Sogdia, founded in the 1st century BCE. It is located 39 kilometers to the northwest of Bukhara. Varakhsha was the capital of the Sogdian dynasty of the kings of Bukhara, the Bukhar Khudahs. It ultimately never recovered from the Muslim conquest of Transoxiana.

Murals
Beautiful murals have been recovered from the palace area, dated to the 8th century CE. They show a king and his retinue riding elephants and fighting tigers and monstruous beasts.

References

Central Asia
Archaeological sites in Uzbekistan
Former populated places in Uzbekistan